Shehroze Kashif (born 11 March 2002) is a Pakistani mountaineer who became the youngest climber in the world to summit K2 on 27 July 2021. He became the youngest Pakistani to summit Mount Everest on 11 May 2021. After the successful summit of Mount Everest, Sports Board Punjab made him the youth ambassador of Punjab, Pakistan. He summited Broad Peak at the age of 17, after which he was called 'The Broad Boy'. He started climbing mountains at the age of 11 with the first one being Makra Peak, followed by Musa ka Musalla and Chembra Peak at age 12, Mingli Sar in Shimshal at age 13 and Khurdopin Pass at age 15 and Khosar Gang in alpine style at 18 years of age. He currently holds two Guinness World Records for being the youngest to climb K2 and the youngest to climb Broad Peak. On 5 May 2022, Kashif became the youngest in the world and the first Pakistani to reach the summit of Kangchenjunga - the third highest peak in the world. On 16 May 2022, Kashif summited the world's fourth-highest peak, Mount Lhotse (8,516m), in Nepal. On 1 November 2022, Shehroze Kashif was recognised by Guinness World Records for the year 2023 for summiting Mount Everest and K2.

In July 2022, Shehroze Kashif and Fazal Ali went missing between Camp 4 and Camp 3, after successfully summiting Nanga Parbat. However, the duo was discovered shortly after.

Mountaineering expeditions 
Broad Peak 14 July 2019
Mount Everest 11 May 2021
K2 - 27 July 2021
Manaslu - 25 September 2021
Kangchenjunga - 05 May 2022
Lhotse - 16 May 2022
Makalu - 28 May 2022
Nanga Parbat - 5 July 2022
Gasherbrum II - 08 August 2022
Gasherbrum I - 12 August 2022

References 

Pakistani summiters of Mount Everest
Pakistani mountain climbers
Pakistani summiters of Broad Peak
Living people
2002 births